Marino "Mario" Evaristo (10 December 1908 – 30 April 1993) was an Argentine footballer who played for the Argentina national football team. He was a member of the runner-up Argentine team in the 1930 FIFA World Cup and along with his elder brother Juan, a wing half-back, they became the first siblings to appear in a World Cup final.

Evaristo was christened Marino, but later changed his name to Mario.
He played for Sportivo Palermo, Club Atlético Independiente and Boca Juniors in Argentina, he was part of the Boca team that won the Primera Division Argentina 1931 (the first professional champions of Argentina).

Later in his career he moved to Europe, where he played for Genoa C.F.C. in Italy, and for Nice and Antibes in France.

With his brother Juan, he was in charge of Boca's youth academies for more than 30 years.

Honours

Club Atlético Boca Juniors
 Argentine Primera División: 1926, 1930, 1931
 Copa Estimulo: 1926

Sportivo Barracas
 AAAF amateur Championship: 1932

International goals
Argentina's goal tally first

References

External links

Statistics at Historia de Boca 

1908 births
1930 FIFA World Cup players
1993 deaths
Footballers from Buenos Aires
Argentine footballers
Argentine people of Italian descent
Argentine Primera División players
Boca Juniors footballers
Club Atlético Independiente footballers
All Boys managers
Serie A players
Genoa C.F.C. players
OGC Nice players
Ligue 1 players
Ligue 2 players
Expatriate footballers in France
Expatriate footballers in Italy
Argentina international footballers
Argentine expatriate footballers
Copa América-winning players
FC Antibes players
Association football forwards
Argentine football managers
Argentine expatriate sportspeople in France
Argentine expatriate sportspeople in Italy